Elections to South Cambridgeshire District Council took place on Thursday 6 May 2010, as part of the 2010 United Kingdom local elections. The election also took place at the same time as the 2010 United Kingdom general election. Nineteen seats, making up one third of South Cambridgeshire District Council, were up for election. Seats up for election in 2010 were last contested at the 2006 election. The Conservative Party retained their majority on the council, despite losing seats.

Summary
At this election, Conservatives were defending 11 seats, Liberal Democrats were defending 6 seats and Independents were defending 2. Since the 2006 election, a by-election had been held in Balsham where the Conservatives had held the seat.

The Liberal Democrats had a good night, taking seats from the Conservatives in Balsham, Cottenham and Melbourn and from independents in Fulbourn and Histon and Impington. Conservatives however gained a seat from the Liberal Democrats in the Shelfords and Stapleford.

Results

Results by ward

References

2010
2010 English local elections
May 2010 events in the United Kingdom
2010s in Cambridgeshire